Donald William Peterman,  (January 3, 1932 – February 5, 2011) was an American cinematographer whose numerous feature film credits included Flashdance, Cocoon, Star Trek IV: The Voyage Home, Point Break, and Men in Black.  He was a regular collaborator of directors like Ron Howard, Barry Sonnenfeld, and Ron Underwood. He was a two-time Academy Award nominee and a member of the Academy of Motion Picture Arts and Sciences and the American Society of Cinematographers since 1984.

Life and career
Peterman was born in Los Angeles, on January 3, 1932. He graduated from Redondo Union High School in Redondo Beach, California, before serving in the United States Army during the early 1950s. Peterman began shooting documentaries for the U.S. Army during his time in the service.

Peterman began his professional career as a clapper loader for Hal Roach Studios at the age of 22 after leaving the U.S. Army. He departed Hal Roach Studios for Cascade Studios, where he worked the optical printer and animation camera. Peterman left Cascade Studios to work on the Lassie television series, but later returned to Cascade Studios to become director of photography for the studio's television commercial productions.

Peterman made his film debut as director of photography in the 1979 horror film, When a Stranger Calls. The film, described by Peterman as a "a down-and-dirty production," was shot in 25 days with a $1.7 million budget. Peterman was able to shoot nighttime scenes in six foot-candles of soft light without the aid of high-speed film stock or lenses.

Peterman was nominated for an Academy Award for Best Cinematography on the 1983 film, Flashdance, starring Jennifer Beals. However, he lost to Sven Nykvist at the 56th Academy Awards. Peterman received his second nomination in 1986 for his work on Star Trek IV: The Voyage Home, which was directed by Leonard Nimoy, but lost to Chris Menges at the 59th Academy Awards in 1987. Peterman's many other film credits included Splash in 1984, Cocoon in 1985, 1991's Point Break and the comedy Get Shorty, which was released in 1995, and Men In Black in 1997.

In 1997, Peterman suffered head injuries, a broken leg and broken ribs in an accident on the film set of Mighty Joe Young. Peterman was on a platform suspended eighteen feet from the ground when the crane holding the platform snapped, throwing Peterman to the ground. A cameraman working with Peterman was also injured in the accident. Production was delayed for two days, and Peterman was replaced by Oliver Wood for the remainder of principal photography.

Peterman's last film was Ron Howard's How the Grinch Stole Christmas in 2000.

Don Peterman died at his home in Palos Verdes Estates, California, of myelodysplastic syndrome on February 5, 2011, at the age of 79.

Filmography

References

External links

1932 births
2011 deaths
Deaths from myelodysplastic syndrome
American cinematographers
Film people from Los Angeles
People from Redondo Beach, California
People from Palos Verdes Estates, California